John James Foreman (6 October 1913 – 1964) was an English professional footballer who played as an outside right in the Football League for Sunderland, West Ham United, Bury and Swansea Town.

Previously with Sunderland, Foreman joined Second Division club West Ham United for the 1934–35 season. He made his debut on 29 September 1934, a home win against Plymouth Argyle, and made 23 League and cup appearances in his first season, scoring 3 goals. He followed this up with 20 League appearances, and 4 goals, in his second season. After losing his place to Stan Foxall in 1936-37, he moved to Bury.

Foreman played for Workington and South Shields, before joining Hartlepools United in 1939-40. He made three appearances for Pools before the League was suspended due to the outbreak of World War II.

References

1913 births
1964 deaths
Footballers from County Durham
English footballers
Association football wingers
West Stanley F.C. players
Crook Town A.F.C. players
Sunderland A.F.C. players
West Ham United F.C. players
Bury F.C. players
Swansea City A.F.C. players
Workington A.F.C. players
South Shields F.C. (1936) players
Hartlepool United F.C. players
English Football League players
People from Tanfield, County Durham